The 1934–35 Sheffield Shield season was the 39th season of the Sheffield Shield, the domestic first-class cricket competition of Australia. Victoria won the championship.

Table

Statistics

Most Runs
Jack Fingleton 593

Most Wickets
Chuck Fleetwood-Smith 60

References

Sheffield Shield
Sheffield Shield
Sheffield Shield seasons